A Dark Lantern is a lost 1920 American silent drama film produced and released by Realart Pictures. It is based on a 1905 novel of the same name by Elizabeth Robins.

John S. Robertson directed and Alice Brady and her then husband James Crane star.

According to the AFI Catalog, the film was shot at the Essanay studios in Chicago as that was where Alice Brady was appearing in a play at the time.

Plot
As described in a film magazine, mistaking the intentions of Prince Anton (Denny) of Argovinia in seeking her hand, young English woman Katherine Dereham (Brady) suffers a great shock when his attentions culminate in a proposal that she be his morganatic wife, his country requiring an alliance with a royal princess. This, together with the blow of her father's death, shatters Katherine's nerves and causes a breakdown. She recovers under the rigid administrations of Dr. Garth Vincent (Crane). Her attitude of antagonistic exaggeration of his sternness that conceives it as sheer brutality makes her submission to the deep love he bears her a sorrowful task. His patience at last breaks her embittered spirit and sends her to his home, willing to accept his protection under compromising circumstances. The realness of his affection is at last revealed to her and Prince Anton, whose love for Katherine has made him risk his throne by divorcing his wife, is sent back to Argovinia.

Cast
Alice Brady as Katherine Dereham
James Crane as Dr. Garth Vincent
Reginald Denny as Prince Anton
Brandon Hurst as Colonel Dereham
Marie Burke as Lady Peterborough
David Monterno as Graf-Wilhelm
Carolyn Irwin as Mrs. Hally
Mrs. Tony West as Mrs. Todine
Roni Pursell as Princess Margaretha
Russell McDermott as Leonard
Virginia Huppert as Nurse for Katherine
Dorothy Betts as Natalie, Maid

References

External links

Lantern slide; A Dark Lantern

1920 films
Films directed by John S. Robertson
Films based on American novels
Lost American films
1920 drama films
Silent American drama films
American black-and-white films
American silent feature films
Films set in England
1920 lost films
Lost drama films
1920s American films